Sergio Pompanin (born March 6, 1939) is an Italian bobsledder who competed in the late 1960s. He won a silver medal in the four-man event at the 1969 FIBT World Championships in Lake Placid, New York.

References
Bobsleigh four-man world championship medalists since 1930

Italian male bobsledders
Living people
1939 births
Place of birth missing (living people)